Silberstedt is a municipality in the district of Schleswig-Flensburg, in Schleswig-Holstein, Germany. It is situated approximately 13 km west of Schleswig.

Silberstedt is the seat of the Amt ("collective municipality") Arensharde.

References

Schleswig-Flensburg